The first series of the children's British cooking programme Matilda and the Ramsay Bunch aired from 12 April to 21 July 2015, The series was created by CBBC the series follows the Ramsay family on their summer holidays in L.A where Matilda (Tilly) Ramsay cooks her favourite meals and foods while the rest of the family go out trying new things such as surfing, making their own drive in and Tilly also challenges her family to do challenges in each show.

Production

Development
It was announced in January 2015 that CBBC had created a new children's cooking show. The show stars the Ramsay family on their summer holidays in L.A. The first series was made up of 15x15 minute episodes which started airing in April 2015 and ran for 15 weeks finishing on 21 July 2015.

Filming
Filming for the first series of Matilda and the Ramsay Bunch took place in America in L.A where the Ramsay family own a house, most of the filming took place on location and in the kitchen. Filming took place a year before broadcast in summer 2014 and began airing in 2015, the series is filmed during the U.K summer holidays.

Episodes

Ratings

References

External links
 
 

2015 British television seasons